Olginsk is a rural locality (a settlement) in Zlatoutovsky Selsoviet of Selemdzhinsky District, Amur Oblast, Russia. The population was 103 as of 2018. There are 3 streets.

Geography 
Olginsk is located in the valley of the Bolshaya Elga River, 61 km southeast of Ekimchan (the district's administrative centre) by road. Ivanovskoye is the nearest rural locality.

References 

Rural localities in Selemdzhinsky District